Ramsey is an unincorporated area and ghost town in the Unorganized North Part of Sudbury District in northeastern Ontario, Canada.

The community was established in 1937 to house gold mine workers at the nearby Jerome Mine operations. Although the mine itself was abandoned by 1945, the community survived by expanding its lumber operations, and had its own post office by 1948. The community had a population of approximately 300 at its peak.

The community was eventually abandoned after E. B. Eddy shut down the sawmill in 1987, although the remaining townsite itself was not fully dismantled until 2002.

The townsite is accessible via the Sultan Industrial Road. The Canadian Pacific Railway transcontinental main line runs through the town site.

References

External links
 Ramsey profile at ghosttowns.com

Mining communities in Ontario
Ghost towns in Northern Ontario
Company towns in Canada
Communities in Sudbury District